Denis Sefton Delmer (24 May 1904, Berlin, Germany – 4 September 1979, Lamarsh, Essex) was a British journalist of Australian heritage and propagandist for the British government during the Second World War. Fluent in German, he became friendly with Ernst Röhm, who arranged for him to interview Adolf Hitler in 1931. During the war, he led a black propaganda campaign against Hitler by radio from England. It was so successful that Delmer was named in the Nazis' Black Book for immediate arrest after their planned invasion of Britain.

Early life
Denis Sefton Delmer, known familiarly as "Tom", was born in Berlin as a British subject, as a son of Jewish Australian parents living in Germany. His father, Frederick Sefton Delmer, was British of Australian heritage, born in Hobart, Tasmania, who became Professor of English Literature at Berlin University and author of a standard textbook for German schools. On the outbreak of the First World War his father was interned in Ruhleben internment camp, near Berlin, as an enemy alien. In 1917, the Delmer family was repatriated to England in a prisoner exchange between the British and German governments. He was brought up to speak only German until the age of five, and as late as 1939 spoke English with a slight accent.

Early career

After leaving university, Delmer worked as a freelance journalist until he was recruited by the Daily Express to become head of its new Berlin Bureau. Whilst in Germany, he became friendly with Ernst Röhm, who arranged for him to become the first British journalist to interview Adolf Hitler, in April 1931.

In the 1932 German federal election, Delmer travelled with Hitler aboard his private aircraft. He was "embedded with Nazi party activists" at this time, "taking copious notes on everything from the style of the would-be Führer's oratory to the group think that lay behind the bond he was forming with the German people." He was also present in 1933 when Hitler inspected the aftermath of the Reichstag fire. During this period, Delmer was criticised for being a Nazi sympathiser, and for a time, the British government thought he was in the pay of the Nazis. At the same time, the Nazi leaders were convinced Delmer was a member of MI6; his denials of any involvement only served to strengthen their belief that he was not only a member, but an important one.

In 1933, Delmer was sent to France as head of the Daily Express Paris Bureau. In 1936, Delmer married the artist Isabel Nichols. Delmer covered important events in Europe including the Spanish Civil War and the invasion of Poland by the Wehrmacht in 1939. He also reported on the German western offensive in 1940.

Wartime
Delmer returned to Britain and worked for a time as an announcer for the German service of the BBC. After Hitler broadcast a speech from the Reichstag offering peace terms, Delmer responded immediately, stating that the British cast the terms in "your lying, stinking teeth". Delmer's instant, and unauthorised rejection had a great impact on Germany, where Joseph Goebbels concluded it had to have come from the government. That gave an impact any authorisation would have prevented and produced consternation in Whitehall. The effect was desirable, but it was unclear whether such a spokesman would again happen to say what the government wanted.

Radio stations
In September 1940, Delmer was recruited by the Political Warfare Executive (PWE), to organise black propaganda broadcasts to Nazi Germany as part of a psychological warfare campaign. Leonard Ingrams gained clearance for Delmer to work for the Political Intelligence Department of the Foreign Office. Based at Wavendon Towers (now in Milton Keynes), the operation joined a number of other "research units" operating propaganda broadcasts. The concept was that the radio station would undermine Hitler by pretending to be a fervent Hitler-Nazi supporter. Under Delmer's leadership a number of notable people played a part: Muriel Spark, Ellic Howe, and Delmer's college friend, the cartoonist Osbert Lancaster. Some of Lancaster's Daily Express cartoons were reprinted into booklets aimed at civilians under German occupation and dropped by the RAF.

Delmer's first, most notable success was a shortwave station: Gustav Siegfried Eins (Gustave Siegfried One), G3 in the Research units. It was "run" by the character "Der Chef", an unrepentant Nazi, who disparaged both Winston Churchill ("that flatfooted son of a drunken Jew") and the "Parteikommune", the "Party Commune" supporters who betrayed the Nazi revolution. The station name, "Gustav Siegfried Eins" (phonetic alphabet for "GS1") left a question in listeners' minds – did it mean Geheimsender 1: (Secret Transmitter 1) or Generalstab 1 (General Staff 1)? The station was broadcast from nearby Gawcott.

GS1 went on the air on the evening of 23 May 1941. Der Chef, played by Peter Secklemann, a former Berlin journalist, was then the only member of the team to have arrived at the discreet house known as "The Rookery" in Aspley Guise, Bedfordshire. Another journalist, Johannes Reinholz, played an adjutant to Der Chef.

When Stafford Cripps discovered what Delmer was involved with (through the intervention of Richard Crossman, who had sent him a transcript from the broadcast of one of Delmer's more salacious inventions), Cripps wrote to Anthony Eden, then Foreign Secretary: "If this is the sort of thing that is needed to win the war, why, I'd rather lose it." Delmer was defended by Robert Bruce Lockhart, who pointed out the need to reach the sadist in the German nature. GS1 ran for 700 broadcasts before Delmer killed it off in late 1943 with gunfire heard over the radio intimating the authorities had caught up with Der Chef. The dramatic ending may have been deliberately based on the Gleiwitz incident, when the Nazis staged the capture of a German radio station by Polish forces, an operation which Hitler used to justify the invasion of Poland and the start of the Second World War. Owing to an error by a non-German-speaking transmitter engineer, the programme was accidentally repeated and Der Chef's dramatic on-air murder was broadcast twice.

Delmer created several stations and was successful through a careful use of intelligence using gossip intercepted in German mail to neutral countries to create credible stories. Delmer's credit within the intelligence agencies was such that the Admiralty sought him out to target German submarine crews with demoralising news bulletins. For this, Delmer had access to Aspidistra, a 500 kW radio transmitter obtained from RCA in the US (their largest off-the-shelf-model), which Section VIII bought for £165,000. Use of Aspidistra, which began in 1942, was split between PWE, the BBC, and the RAF. Delmer's creation was Deutscher Kurzwellensender Atlantik (or popularly Atlantiksender). This station used US jazz (banned within Germany as decadent) and up-to-date dance music from Germany (extracted via Sweden and RAF courier), as well as an in-house German dance band. Important details on naval procedures came from anti-Nazis identified in POW camps, whose mail was sifted to create personalised announcements. Agnes Bernelle "played" the seductive "Vicki" and announced news bulletins.

Christ the King (G.8) broadcast an attack on the conscience of religious Germans, telling of the horrors of the labour and concentration camps, through a German priest.

Soldatensender Calais
Soldatensender Calais ("Calais Armed Forces Radio Station") was another clandestine radio station directed at the German armed forces by Delmer. Based in Milton Bryan and transmitted by the Aspidistra transmitter at Crowborough, Soldatensender Calais broadcast a combination of popular music, "cover" support of the war, and "dirt" – items inserted to demoralise German forces. Delmer's black propaganda sought to propagate rumours that German soldiers' wives were sleeping with the many foreign workers in Germany at the time. As it happened, the station proved to be popular on the German home front.

Delmer also oversaw the production of a daily "grey" German-language newspaper titled Nachrichten für die Truppe ("News for the Troops"), which first appeared in May 1944, much of its text being based on the Soldatensender Calais broadcasts. Nachrichten für die Truppe was written by a team provided to Delmer by SHAEF, and disseminated over Germany, Belgium, and France each morning by the Special Leaflet Squadron of the US Eighth Air Force.

When fighting entered Germany itself, black propaganda was used to create an impression of an anti-Nazi resistance movement.

At the end of the war in Europe, Delmer advised his colleagues not to publicise the work they had been involved in, lest unrepentant Nazis claim (as had been the case after the First World War), that they had been defeated by unconscionable methods, rather than on the battlefield. Consequently, former Nazis were able to claim, without contradiction, that they had assisted the fictitious resistance movement; Delmer described this unintended consequence as a "black boomerang".

Later career and retirement

After the Second World War, Delmer returned to the Daily Express as chief foreign affairs reporter. Reinhard Gehlen stated it was Delmer's Daily Express article of 17 March 1952 which dragged the German intelligence chief into the daylight by unleashing a "flood of further publications". Over the next fifteen years, he covered nearly every major foreign news story for the newspaper. However, he was sacked by Lord Beaverbrook in 1959 over an expenses issue, and retired to Lamarsh in Essex, near Little Sampford, where his former wife Isabel lived with her third husband. He died at Lamarsh, after a long illness, on 4 September 1979.

Delmer wrote two volumes of autobiography, Trail Sinister (1961) and Black Boomerang (1962), and several other books, including Weimar Germany (1972) and The Counterfeit Spy (1971). David Hare based his play Licking Hitler on Black Boomerang, and his plot included the faked, on-air discovery and shooting of the broadcaster, in the same way as Delmer had finished the career of "Der Chef".

Delmer was the subject of a This Is Your Life broadcast in 1962, when he was surprised by Eamonn Andrews outside Le Caprice restaurant in London's Mayfair.

See also
Gleiwitz incident

Notes

External links
The Sefton Delmer Archive: The online archive of all of Sefton Delmer's books, including his autobiography Black Boomerang.
Gray and Black Radio Propaganda against Nazi Germany Extensively illustrated paper describing the Allied effort in the Second World War to undermine Germany through unidentified or misidentified radio broadcasts.
Yours Faithfully, Adolf Hitler Correspondence between Delmer and Hitler in 1931.

Alumni of Lincoln College, Oxford
Black propaganda
People educated at St Paul's School, London
Propaganda theorists
Psychological warfare theorists
World War I civilian detainees held by Germany
1904 births
1979 deaths
Foreign Office personnel of World War II
Australian expatriates in Germany
Australian emigrants to the United Kingdom